The 1940 Allan Cup was the Canadian senior ice hockey championship for the 1939–40 season.

Final 
Best of 5
Kirkland Lake 8 Calgary 5
Kirkland Lake 9 Calgary 1
Kirkland Lake 7 Calgary 1

Kirkland Lake Blue Devils beat Calgary Stampeders 3-0 on series.

External links
Allan Cup archives 
Allan Cup website

 
Allan Cup
Allan